Emanuel Fortes Nascimento (born 13 August 1970 in Minas Gerais) is a former international freestyle swimmer from Brazil, who participated in two consecutive Summer Olympics for his native country, starting in 1988. His best result was the 6th place in the Men's 4×100-metre freestyle in 1992.

At the 1988 Summer Olympics, in Seoul, he finished 10th in the 4×200-metre freestyle, 12th in the 4×100-metre freestyle, 18th in the 4×100-metre medley, 36th in the 200-metre butterfly, and 37th in the 100-metre freestyle.

He was the South American record holder of the 100-metre freestyle, between 1990 and 1991.

At the 1991 World Aquatics Championships, Nascimento finished 24th in the 100-metre freestyle, and 26th in the 200-metre freestyle.

He was at the 1991 Pan American Games, in Havana. He won gold in the 4×100-metre freestyle, and silver in the 4×200-metre freestyle. He also finished 6th in the 100-metre freestyle, and 7th in the 100-metre butterfly.

At the 1992 Summer Olympics, in Barcelona, he finished 6th in the 4×100-metre freestyle, 7th in the 4×200-metre freestyle, and 25th in the 100-metre freestyle.

After closing the swimming career, he became commercial director of Monytel, a company that operates in the field of communications.

References

External links 
 
 

1970 births
Living people
Brazilian male butterfly swimmers
Swimmers at the 1988 Summer Olympics
Swimmers at the 1991 Pan American Games
Swimmers at the 1992 Summer Olympics
Olympic swimmers of Brazil
Place of birth missing (living people)
Pan American Games gold medalists for Brazil
Pan American Games silver medalists for Brazil
Brazilian male freestyle swimmers
Pan American Games medalists in swimming
Medalists at the 1991 Pan American Games
21st-century Brazilian people
20th-century Brazilian people